Juliettes may refer to:
 Juliette, Eure, a commune in the department of Eure, France
 Les Juliettes, a summit in the Swiss Alps
 "Juliettes", a song by MC Solaar on the 2003 album Mach 6